Charles John Miller Scott (born May 24, 1963) is a former American football wide receiver in the National Football League (NFL) for the Los Angeles Rams and Dallas Cowboys. He played college football at Vanderbilt University.

Early years
Scott attended Lake Howell (FL), where he participated in football and track. He accepted a football scholarship from Vanderbilt University. As a freshman, he played mostly on special teams.

As a sophomore, he was named starter at flanker, posting 21 receptions for 273 yards (13-yard avg.) and 3 touchdowns. In the 1982 Hall of Fame Classic, he caught five passes for 93 yards in a 28-36 loss against Air Force.

As a junior, he played on a team with a 2-9 record, that led the league in pass attempts because it usually played from behind. He was switched to tight end, setting an NCAA record for the position with 70 receptions (third in school history and second on the team) and tied the record with 9 touchdowns, while also tallying 971 receiving yards (third in school history and led the team).

As a senior, he played between the flanker and tight end position, collecting 54 receptions (second on the team) for 975 yards (second in school history and led the team), with a 18.1-yard average and 8 touchdowns.

He finished his college career with 145 receptions (second in school history), 2,219 yards (second in school history), a 15.3-yard average and 20 touchdowns (second in school history).

Professional career

Los Angeles Rams
Scott was selected by the Los Angeles Rams in the 2nd round (50th overall) of the 1985 NFL Draft. On September 3, he was placed on the injured reserve list with a shoulder injury he suffered in the third preseason game.

On September 1, 1986, he was waived only to be recalled from waivers on September 3. He played in just 8 games, making 5 receptions for 76 yards, before being placed on the injured reserve list on November 13. Scott was released on September 7, 1987.

Dallas Cowboys
After the NFLPA strike was declared on the third week of the 1987 season, those contests were canceled (reducing the 16 game season to 15) and the NFL decided that the games would be played with replacement players. He was signed to be a part of the Dallas replacement team that was given the mock name "Rhinestone Cowboys" by the media. He appeared in 2 games as a third-string wide receiver. His only statistic was one reception for 11 yards against the Philadelphia Eagles. He was released on October 26, at the end of the strike.

San Francisco 49ers
In 1988, he was signed as a free agent by the San Francisco 49ers. He was released on September 14.

Personal life
Scott works for a ministry in Atlanta named Young Life.

References

1961 births
Living people
Players of American football from Jacksonville, Florida
American football wide receivers
Vanderbilt Commodores football players
Los Angeles Rams players
Dallas Cowboys players
National Football League replacement players